= Speed limits in Liechtenstein =

The general speed limits in Liechtenstein are the same for every category of vehicle. They are as follows:

General Speed limits
Type of road	Limit
Urban	50 km/h (31 mph)
Rural	80 km/h (50 mph)
